The following is an incomplete list of the moths of Egypt.

Erebinae 
 Achaea lienardi (Boisduval, 1933)
 Cerocala illustrata (Holland, 1897)
 Clytie sancta (Staudinger, 1900)

Crambidae

Acentropinae 
 Parapoynx diminutalis (Snellen, 1880)

Odontiinae 
 Aporodes floralis (Hubner, 1809)

References 
 African moths

Egypt